HLX may refer to:
 HLX (gene), a gene in humans that encodes the H2.0 homeobox protein.
 HLX-1, an intermediate-mass black hole.
 Hapag-Lloyd Express, a former German airline.